The 2021–22 Louisiana–Monroe Warhawks men's basketball team represented the University of Louisiana at Monroe in the 2021–22 NCAA Division I men's basketball season. The Warhawks, led by 12th-year head coach Keith Richard, played their home games at Fant–Ewing Coliseum in Monroe, Louisiana as members of the Sun Belt Conference.

Previous season
The Warhawks finished the 2020–21 season 7–18, 5–13 in Sun Belt play to finish in last place in the West Division. They lost to South Alabama in the first round of the Sun Belt tournament.

Roster

Schedule and results

|-
!colspan=12 style=| Non-conference regular season

|-
!colspan=9 style=| Sun Belt regular season

|-
!colspan=9 style=|Sun Belt tournament

Sources

References

Louisiana–Monroe Warhawks men's basketball seasons
Louisiana-Monroe Warhawks
Louisiana-Monroe Warhawks men's basketball
Louisiana-Monroe Warhawks men's basketball